Yeimar Mendoza Carabalí is a Colombian weightlifter. He is a two-time gold medalist at the Bolivarian Games and a two-time medalist at the Pan American Weightlifting Championships.

Career 

He won the gold medal in the men's 102kg Snatch and Clean & Jerk events at the 2022 Bolivarian Games held in Valledupar, Colombia.

He won the silver medal in the men's 102kg event at the 2022 Pan American Weightlifting Championships held in Bogotá, Colombia.

Achievements

References

External links 
 

Living people
Year of birth missing (living people)
Colombian male weightlifters
Pan American Weightlifting Championships medalists
21st-century Colombian people